Guaminí Partido is a partido in the west of Buenos Aires Province in Argentina.

Economy
The economy of Guaminí partido is dominated by the cultivation of wheat, maize, soya beans, sunflowers, alfalfa, sorghum and oats.

Other industries include beef and dairy farming and related farming services.

Settlements
 Arroyo Venado
 Casbas
 Garré
 Guaminí
 Huanguelén
 Laguna Alsina

1886 establishments in Argentina
Partidos of Buenos Aires Province